The 1924 Mississippi A&M Aggies baseball team represented the Mississippi Aggies of Mississippi A&M in the 1924 NCAA baseball season. Clay Hopper was an outfielder on the team, and Buddy Myer a second baseman.

Schedule and results

References

Mississippi State Bulldogs
Mississippi State Bulldogs baseball seasons
Southern Conference baseball champion seasons